Oleh Syzon is a Ukrainian retired footballer.

Career
Born in the town of Konotop, Sumy region. Vikhovanets of the Kiev Regional Military University of Physical Culture. In 1995 he signed his first professional contract with Kryvbas Kryvyi Rih. The football club of Kryvorizkyi made a debut on April 30, 1995, in a new (0: 0) visitor match of the 25th round of the Vishche League of Ukraine against Kremin Kremenchuk. Oleg went on the field on the 89th minutes, having replaced Vladislav Maltsev. He played 2 matches in the Ukrainian Premier League in 1994/95 with Kryvbas Kryvyi Rih.

In the jokes of the game practice before the start of the offensive season, the journey to Kakhovka, de zmіg otrimate the power of more gratitude. He made his debut for the Kakhovsky collective of the 1st serpnya of 1995 in the faulty (1: 3) visibility match of the 1/128 final of the Ukrainian Cup against Odessa's and he entered on the field in the starting to play the whole match. In Another Lizi of Ukraine, I made my debut for the new team on the 8th sickle of 1995 in a broken (0: 3) match in the 2nd round of group A against Tysmenets' Khutrovik. The debut goal in the professional career was marked on the 6th day of 1995 for the 72nd program (1: 6) victorious match in the 9th round of the group A of the Other League of Ukraine against the black Desna Chernihiv.  In the first half of the 1995/96 season, he played 15 matches (3 goals) against the Other Lizi of Ukraine and 1 match against the Ukrainian Cup. Before the start of the offensive season, having come to Slovyants from a native place, the football player has 15 matches (1 goal) in the amateur championship of Ukraine.

In 1997, he moved to Borysfen Boryspil. Debuting at the Borysfen Boryspil football club on 14 July 1997 in a cross-country (3: 0) home match for the 1/256 final of the Ukrainian Cup against the Rigondi Bilotserk. Oleg viyshov was on the field in the starting warehouse and played the whole match, and on the 67th day it was scored his debut goal with the new team. He made his debut for Borysfen Boryspil on 31 December 1997 in the lost match at home of the 1st round of group A against Mykolaiv. Season vyshov on the field in the starting warehouse and played the whole match. The debut goal of the Other Lizi of Ukraine marked the 6 th of 1997 against the 21st hwiline of a peremogy (2: 1) viable match in the 8th round of the group A against Tysmenytsia. Oleg viyshov on the field in the starting warehouse and played the whole match. In the first half of the 1997/98 season, he won 15 matches (2 goals) against the Other Ukraine, and 2 more matches (1 goal) against the Ukrainian Cup. For an hour of winter, take a break at the specified season and move to Metallurg. He made his debut in the football team of the Mariupolsk team on April 1, 1998, in the unfinished (0: 1) home match quarterfinal of the Ukrainian Cup against Dynamo Kyiv. The debut goal in the football team of the "metallurgists" was the 12th heart of 1998 on the 38th weight of the poor (2: 1) match against the 29th round of the Victory League against the Vorskla Poltava. Season vyshov on the field in the starting warehouse and played the entire match. At the warehouse of the Mariupoltsy won 9 matches at the Vishіy lizі, in which there was 1 goal, as well as 1 matches in the Ukrainian Cup.

Before the start of the 1998/99 season, he turned to Borysfen Boryspil, at the warehouse of which he won 12 matches (1 goal) against the Other Lizi of Ukraine. After the hour of the winter pause, the season is said to have turned to "Metallurgist", albeit a stable game practice, without having taken it off. For a friend, half of the 1998/99 season, and the first half of the offensive season, I played 7 matches at Vishіy Lizі, for whom I turned at Borysfen Boryspil. In the spring of 2000, I once again seized the colori of the Borysfen Boryspil club, and at once made the way from Ukrainian First League to the Ukrainian Premier League. From 2001 to 2003 he played for Borysfen-2 Boryspil. In the 2003/04 season, the rockets also played for Desna Chernihiv against the Other Lizi of Ukraine (9 matches and 1 own goal).

After an hour of winter break the season 2005/06 after finishing his professional career and moving to Shakhtar Konotop, the football player in 2006 won 3 matches in the amateur championship of Ukraine. In 2010, they seized the color "girnikiv" from the championship of the Sumy Oblast.

References

External links 
 Oleg Syzon footballfacts.ru
 Oleg Syzon allplayers.in.ua

1977 births
Living people
FC Desna Chernihiv players
Ukrainian footballers
Ukrainian Premier League players
Ukrainian First League players
Ukrainian Second League players
Association football defenders